The 2016 Women's Six Nations Championship, also known as the 2016 RBS Women's Six Nations due to the tournament's sponsorship by the Royal Bank of Scotland, was the 15th series of the Women's Six Nations Championship, an annual women's rugby union competition between six European rugby union national teams. Matches were played in February and March 2016, on the same weekends as the men's tournament. France won the championship after beating England in their final game. France and England were tied on eight table points each after winning four games, France took the title on the points difference tie-breaker.

Participants

Table

Fixtures and results

Week 1

Week 2

Week 3

Week 4

Week 5

References

External links
The official RBS Six Nations Site 

2016
2016 rugby union tournaments for national teams
2015–16 in Irish rugby union
2015–16 in English rugby union
2015–16 in Welsh rugby union
2015–16 in Scottish rugby union
2015–16 in French rugby union
2015–16 in Italian rugby union
Six
rugby union
rugby union
rugby union
rugby union
rugby union
Women
rugby union
Women's Six Nations
Women's Six Nations